The Maharlika Pilipinas Basketball League (MPBL) is a men's professional basketball league in the Philippines.

History

Founding 
Manny Pacquiao launched the Maharlika Pilipinas Basketball League on August 29, 2017, starting off as a semi-professional league. According to Pacquiao, the league is not intended to be a competitor to the Philippine Basketball Association, the country's top professional basketball league. The MPBL was intended to feature both the regional commercial and barangay-level league, with teams on the commercial side to have a home locality in addition to a corporate sponsor.

In the first months, the league hosted teams from Luzon with future plans to expand to accommodate teams based in Visayas and Mindanao like the defunct Metropolitan Basketball Association. It is planned that an expanded MPBL will have two conferences, North and South, where the best teams from both divisions will face in the finals similar to the format of the National Basketball Association of the United States.

The league was planned to start as early as September 23, 2017 with at least six teams. A pre-season was held with the Bulacan Kuyas finishing as champions.

First seasons (2018–2021) 
The MPBL began its first season (named the Anta Rajah Cup) on January 25, 2018, and included ten teams, all based in Luzon. In the opening game at the Smart Araneta Coliseum, the Parañaque Patriots secured a 70–60 victory over the Caloocan Supremos. The Batangas City Athletics were crowned as the league's first-ever champion when they defeated the Muntinlupa Cagers in the 2018 MPBL Finals.

For the 2018–19 season, the MPBL had expanded its roster of teams to 26, adding 16 expansion teams to the league. After ten expansion teams were admitted into the league, it closed its doors for new applicants from Luzon so that it could leave room for future Visayas and Mindanao teams, which was then discussed in a meeting in Cebu was held on April 28. The Davao Occidental Tigers became the first MPBL team from the Visayas-Mindanao region. This drastic increase led to the addition of the aforementioned Northern and Southern Divisions. The San Juan Knights then became the 2019 champions, beating the Davao Occidental Tigers.

In December 2019, Chooks-to-Go of Bounty Agro Ventures became the title sponsor of the league under a five-year deal. The 2019–20 season featured a record-high 31 teams participating in the league, including 6 expansion teams, but was postponed on March 12, 2020 due to the COVID-19 pandemic, after the second game of the Divisional Finals. Nearly one year later, the league resumed play for the final games of the playoffs on March 10, 2021 through a bubble in Subic. The Davao Occidental Tigers beat the San Juan Knights in a rematch of last season's Finals to become the 2020 champions. Because of the long delay, the 2020–21 season was cancelled altogether. In October 2021, Chooks-to-Go took over the operations of the league.

Professional league (2021–present) 
On November 9, 2021, it was announced that the MPBL will turn into a professional league. They have also lifted the restrictions for Fil-foreign and ex-professional players. On December 9, 2021, the MPBL was granted professional status by the Games and Amusements Board. The league also signed a partnership with sports betting platform OKBet to server as their title sponsor.

The 2022 season featured 22 teams competing. The league held its first preseason tournament, the 2021 Invitational, with the Basilan Jumbo Plastic becoming the tournament's champions, also winning a prize pot of two million pesos. On October 10, 2022, Kyt Jimenez of the Sarangani Marlins became the first player in league history to record a quadruple-double. The Nueva Ecija Rice Vanguards became the 2022 champions, winning against the Zamboanga Family's Brand Sardines.

The upcoming 2023 season will feature 30 teams, including two expansion teams. The 2023 Preseason Invitational was held in General Santos featuring eight teams, among those teams is the first guest team in the league, Bulalakaw. The Zamboanga Family's Brand Sardines won the preseason tournament, beating the Nueva Ecija Rice Vanguards.

Format

Regular season 
The regular season format resembles that of the Philippine Basketball Association. All teams play in a single-round robin format, where each team plays against all of the other teams once. In each gameday, a series of games is played in a team's homecourt, but not all games feature the host team, making them neutral-site games. Gamedays usually end with the host team participating in the final game.

Playoffs 
In each division, the top eight teams by winning percentage advance to the playoffs and are seeded into a single-elimination bracket. The first three rounds (First Round, Divisional Semifinals, and Divisional Finals) are played in a best-of-three series, while the National Finals is played in a best-of-five series.

Teams
During its first season in 2018, the MPBL had ten teams entering the league, all based in Luzon. Since then, it has expanded into Visayas and Mindanao. In the 2023 season, there are 29 teams participating in the league, including two expansion teams in Negros and Quezon.

Team names change often in the league, even mid-season. Teams can be named by something that represents their home city or region, or their title sponsor.

2023 teams

 Notes

  The Pasig Pirates (as Pasig-Rizal Pirates), San Juan Knights and Sarangani Marlins were founded during the active years of Metropolitan Basketball Association (MBA).
  The General Santos Warriors was founded in 2005 as GenSan MP PacMan Warriors and participated in Mindanao Visayas Basketball Association (MVBA), National Basketball Conference (NBC) and Liga Pilipinas in 2008.
  The Sta. Lucia Realtors was founded in 1987 from the Philippine Basketball League (PBL)  Philippine Basketball Association (PBA) in 1993 and the Pilipinas Commercial Basketball League (PCBL) in 2015.
  The Quezon Huskers was founded in 2004 as Quezon Coco Huskers and participated in United Regional Basketball League in 2004.

Former teams

All-time venues

League championships

Media coverage
Similar to the defunct Philippine Basketball League and the former Shakey's V-League prior to 2016, the MPBL employs its own in-house broadcast team for all games.

Television 
On January 11, 2018, it was announced that ABS-CBN and its sports division would be the first television broadcasters in the league. These games were broadcast through S+A, Liga, and its various regional channels in the Philippines, while The Filipino Channel broadcast the games in international markets. Some Finals games would also be aired through the main ABS-CBN channel. In addition, Fox Sports Asia also held the broadcast rights for Monday games until the 2018-19 season.

The broadcast rights when left in jeopardy when ABS-CBN's franchise was expired on May 4, 2020, which led to the dissolution of its sports division on August 31, 2020. Despite that, the network continued to broadcast games through A2Z when the 2020 playoffs resumed.

For the 2021 Invitational, the league then found new broadcast partners in IBC and Tap DMV, where the games were broadcast via the IBC channel and Tap Sports. 

The current television contract began in the 2022 season, where select games are broadcast through One PH and One Sports+. Beginning with the 2023 season, games will also be broadcast on Media Pilipinas TV.

Streaming 
As for streaming, the league broadcasts all of its games through its official Facebook, YouTube, and Kumu pages, as well as on Cignal Play and iWantTFC.

Rules

Game regulations
 FIBA rules

Player eligibility

Player classifications
Local player – Born to full-blooded Filipinos.
Filipino-foreigners – Filipinos born to at least a parent with foreign heritage regardless where they are born or raised or if they are a holder of a Philippine passport.
Ex-pros – Players with prior participation in professional leagues such as the Philippine Basketball Association and the ASEAN Basketball League.
Homegrown player – Players who are native to their team's home locality.

During the 2021 MPBL Invitational, the height limit for Filipino-foreigners was lifted.

Team roster limits
At least three homegrown talents per team
Limit on Filipino-foreigner per team.
One player per team (2018)
Two players per team, only one can play at a time (2019–)
Limit on ex-professional (ex-pro) players per team
Five players per team (2018)
Seven players per team, five can play at a time (2019–)

At least for the 2021 MPBL Invitational, it was announce that the cap on ex-pros and requirement to field homegrowns will be scrapped.

Commissioners

See also
 Philippine Basketball Association
 NBL
 Pilipinas Super League
 Filbasket
 Pilipinas VisMin Super Cup
 Chooks-to-Go Pilipinas 3x3

References

 
Basketball leagues in the Philippines
Sports leagues established in 2017
2017 establishments in the Philippines